RONA a.s. (distribution under RONA brand) is a Slovak drinking glass manufacturer, established in Lednické Rovne, Slovakia, in 1892. The name RONA comes from the former naming of the village ‘‘Lednicz Rone’’. The company manufactures unleaded drinking glasses, known as crystal glass. 96% of production is exported and is available in more than 80 countries worldwide. The yearly production of the company exceeds 60 million pieces (2016). Product segments include households, the gastronomy business, aerospace, and ship catering.

Products of the company can be found at Buckingham Palace and the White House. RONA created also a gift set for the football club Manchester United designed for fan shops in 2006. At the turn of 2008 and 2009, the company created and manufactured sets for fans of FC Barcelona, composed of stemware for champagne, red and white wines and carafes. The glass from Lednické Rovne can be found in the New York Rockefeller center's Rainbow Room, and in luxury hotels in Dubai and Las Vegas. The glass from the RONA company is supplied to airlines including: Emirates, Qatar Airways, Etihad, KLM, and American Airlines. Relief stemware set named Harmony was presented in an American sitcom from the world of young physicists, The Big Bang Theory.

The main manufacturing programs of the glassworks: 
 An automatic manufacturing of the stemware with attached stem, stemware with pulled stem, large accessory pieces such as vases, bowls, carafes and other accessories
 Handmade stemware, tumblers, vases, bowls, carafes and accessories
 Glass (hand made and machine made) refinements by various glass decoration techniques (pantograph etching, cutting, painting, engraving, spraying, screen printing, tampoprint, an automatic calibration by laser).

History

Founding

An entrepreneur Jozef Schreiber founded the company in 1892 as the last and the biggest glassworks of Vienna’s company Schreiber und Neffen, who had the most modern equipment of the time. The company in Lednické Rovne is the most successful Slovak glassworks and the only one left (2017).

It started by the manufacturing of flat glass, later pressed glass under Kaiserkristall brand that the company established as the first in Austria-Hungary. This was popular at the turn of the century for price and the fact that it imitated products of luxury cut lead glass. The goods were sold under the name ’’Imperial Crystal’’. Besides the pressed glass was manufactured hand blown glass under RONA Crystal brand focused on drinking glass and sets for hotels, medical institutions, cafes… as well as domestic glass for a household.

Besides clear glass, the glassworks is known for its decoration techniques such as cutting, engraving, guilloche, painting, spraying, screen printing, tampoprint (an automatic calibration by laser), and pantograph technology. The company in Lednické Rovne established pantographs of English production as the first in Europe in 1896. In the 1940s, the company cooperated in the development of decors with professional designers Vincent Hložník and Martin Benka.

Archived collections show products from the beginning that were decorated, full-colour pieces, along with functional designs of clear, plain glass. These lines were developed by patenting of a new handmade technology. Pulled stem, even more in 1956 than currently, is an indicator of glass products from Lednické Rovne.

The history and production of the company was documented by many specialists in their publications; historians and publicists such as Jan Bárta, Ján Mondok, Eduard Toran, Igor Didov, Karol Hetteš, Jindra Bakošová, Agáta Žáčková, Jarmila Račeková and others. Likewise articles in special magazines such as Glasrevue, Sklář a keramik, Sklárske rozhledy, Umení a remesla, Arte Regalo(Spanish magazine), Tableware International, Offrir International, and Casastile (Italian magazine).

Chronology of development and organizational changes 
The company over time has transitioned into and out of socialism, emerging in 1990 to become an exporter in 1992.

Calendar  of  innovations 
The development of glass production in Lednické Rovne went through many organizational changes, the company overcame many crisis periods of that time and the great program and focused production such as pressed glass, cylinders for lamps, technique and laboratory glass, light bulbs, feeding bottles… changed quite often and it gained the recognition as a producer mostly quality drinking glass at the beginning of 20th century. This program is a representative article of the company to the present when the proportion of hand made and machine production was changed as well as decoration glass. From the half of 60’s of the 20th century, the company focused mainly on a gradual introduction of machinery and automatic production of glass.

Research and development 
Within scientific research activities, the company closely works with domestic and foreign institutions which do activities focused on the glass area.
 Institute of Inorganic Chemistry, Slovak Academy of Sciences, Bratislava, Slovakia 
 VITRUM Laugaricio, Glass Centre of Competence is the joint research laboratory, Trenčín, Slovakia 
 Department of Glass and Ceramics, Institute of Chemical Technology, Prague, Czech Republic 
 Department of Materials technologies and environmental, Faculty of Industrial Technologies Alexander Dubcek University in Puchov, Slovakia
 Slovak Glass Society, Lednicke Rovne, Slovakia
 Union of Glass Industry of the Slovak Republic, Bratislava

Museum 

The Slovak Glass Museum, founded in 1988, connects the modern glassworks with its historical roots. The headquarters of the museum is a castle that was the former residence of founders of the company, reconstructed at the end of the 1980s. Today, it is used as a product showroom and administrative center, and it is used to host a biennial international glass symposium.

The history of the company's production at Lednické Rovne is documented by various collections, saved in deposits of galleries and museums such as Slovak National Museum - Historical Museum in Bratislava, Central Slovakia Museum in Banská Bystrica, Slovak National Museum - Ethnographical museum in Martin, Slovak National Gallery in Bratislava, Museum of Decorative Arts in Prague, and Corning Museum of Glass in New York.

Book publications 
 Bárta Jan: Náčrt k dejinám sklářství na Slovensku. In: Sklářské rozhledy. 1947, č. 1, s. 9-12
 Mondok Ján: Z dejín výroby skla v Lednických Rovniach
 Húževka Milan: Hviezda výtvarného neba Karol Hološko. Bratislava: Ametyst, 2000, 
 Janovíčková Marta: Úžitkové umenie a remeslo po roku 1900. In: Dejiny slovenského výtvarného umenia – 20. storočie. Ed. Rusinová Zora, Bratislava: SNG, 2000, s. 237-241
 Kolesár Zdeno: Genéza a vývoj dizajnu. In: Dejiny slovenského výtvarného umenia – 20. storočie. Ed. Rusinová Zora, Bratislava: SNG, 2000, s. 256-261
 Schrammová Ágnes: Umenie a remeslo. In: Dejiny slovenského výtvarného umenia – 20. storočie. Ed. Rusinová Zora, Bratislava: SNG, 2000, s. 250-255
 Michalides Pavol: Umelecké remeslá na Slovensku. Bratislava: Tatran, 1980
 Michalides Pavol: Úžitková výtvarná tvorba na Slovensku. Od polovice 19. storočia po súčasnosť. Bratislava, Pallas, 1978
 Michalides Pavol: Výtvarná kultúra výroby. Bratislava: Slovenské pedagogické nakladateľstvo, 1984
 Palata Oldřich: Sklo na Světové výstavě Expo 58. In: Bruselský sen. Eds. Kramerová Daniela – Skálová Vanda, Praha: Arbor vitae, 2008, s. 116-131
 Palata Oldřich: Československé sklo po Světové výstavě Expo 58. In: Bruselský sen. Eds. Kramerová Daniela – Skálová Vanda, Praha: Arbor vitae, 2008, s. 276-287
 Toran Eduard: K umeniu okolo nás: užité umenie a priemyslové výtvarníctvo vo Sväze slovenských výtvarných umelcov. Bratislava: Slovenský fond výtvarného umenia, 1965
 Račeková Jarmila: Sto rokov sklárne v Lednických Rovniach 1892 – 1992. Spojené sklárne, Lednické Rovne, 1992
 Pišútová Irena – Bakošová Jindra: Katalóg slovenských sklární. In: Sborník Slovenského národného múzea. História, 17, 1977, s. 227-245
 Pišútová Irena – Bakošová Jindra: Katalóg slovenských sklární. In.: Sborník Slovenského národného múzea. História, 18, 1978, s. 154
 Pupala Štefan a kol.: 75 rokov Spojené sklárne Lednické Rovne 1892-1967. Spojené sklárne, Lednické Rovne, 1967

References

External links 

 Official website of the company
 RONA video
 Web page Schreiber und Neffen created in collaboration with RONA, with the aim of digitizing sample books and catalogs of the J. Schreiber & Neffen the years 1874-1945
 Sklárska pracovná pospolitosť - the corporate newspaper from 1944 available in the digital library of the University Library in Bratislava

Glassmaking companies of Slovakia
Glass trademarks and brands
Manufacturing companies established in 1892
Slovak brands
1892 establishments in Austria-Hungary
Manufacturing companies of Czechoslovakia